Roman Polanski (born 1933) is a Polish naturalized-French film director, producer, writer, and actor.

Polanski may also refer to:

Polanski Unauthorized, biographical film by Damian Chapa about Roman Polanski
Polanski (surname), other people with the surname Polanski or Polansky